The 2006 Asian Beach Volleyball Championships (6th tournament) was a beach volleyball event, that was held from March 12 to 15, 2006 in Kish Island, Iran. The competition included only men's event.

Medal summary

Participating nations 

 (2)
 (7)
 (4)
 (2)
 (1)

Tournament

References

External links
Asian Volleyball Confederation

Asian Championships
Beach volleyball
Asian Beach Volleyball Championship
International volleyball competitions hosted by Iran